The Cromwell Hospital is a private sector hospital located in the South Kensington area of London. It is operated by international healthcare company Bupa.

History
The hospital, which was designed by Holder Mathias, was established by Bank of Credit and Commerce International to provide healthcare for the Abu Dhabi royal family in April 1981. The finance for the construction of this purpose-built facility was arranged by Pakistani banker and philanthropist Agha Hasan Abedi.

The hospital was bought by international healthcare company group Bupa in 2008.

See also 
 Healthcare in London
 List of hospitals in England
Hashim U. Ahmed

References

External links

Hospital buildings completed in 1981
Hospitals in London
Hospitals established in 1981
Health in the Royal Borough of Kensington and Chelsea
Private hospitals in the United Kingdom